Christian Philippe Polak (born August 1950) is a French businessman and author who has published several books on 19th-century Franco-Japanese relations; one Le Monde book review called him "the best specialist on this question".

Career
Born in Nogaro, Polak graduated from the Department of Japanese studies at INALCO, Paris, in 1971. The same year, he entered Waseda University's Institute of Language and Education as a foreign exchange student. In 1973, he entered the Law Department at Hitotsubashi University, and in 1980 completed his doctorate in law, writing his doctoral thesis on diplomatic relations between France and Japan from 1914 to 1925.

After completing his doctoral studies, Polak attempted to obtain a position at a Japanese university, but, according to one source, the then-Japanese government "denied such a possibility to foreigners" despite various demonstrations and petitions. Polak abandoned his academic ambitions, and in 1981 founded in Tokyo the Société d’Etudes et de Recherches Industrielles et Commerciales (K.K. SERIC), providing advice and support to foreign businesses in areas of metallurgy, aeronautics, automobiles, and the environment. In 1990, Polak founded SERIC S.A., a Paris-based consulting company specializing in Franco-Japanese partnerships.

Polak has continued academic and research activities in parallel to his business career. He has been a visiting research fellow at Hitotsubashi University, a law lecturer at Chuo University's Law Department, and a researcher at the Maison Franco-Japonaise. With Tomohiko Taniguchi, the Deputy Press Secretary to Japan's Ministry of Foreign Affairs, Polak contributed lead essays to the July 2003 Gaiko Forum, a foreign-affairs journal published by Toshi Shuppan.

Polak is also President of the Franco-Japanese Association of Kanagawa, and was nominated by the French government as "consultant for the foreign trade of France" in 2002. He received the Medal of the Ordre national du Mérite (Chevalier class on 29 September 1989, and Officer class on 30 April 2002).

Books

Writing in the foreword to Polak's book, Hiroshi Ueki, former director of Japan's Agency for Cultural Affairs, called Polak "a recognized historian of Franco-Japanese relations as well as an accomplished businessman." Polak has written several books on the interaction between France and Japan from the Bakumatsu period around 1858, when both countries opened diplomatic relations. The art book Soie et Lumieres (2001) described the interaction between Japan's silk trade and France's exports of technology, and Sabre et Pinceau (2005) the military and artistic relations of the two countries.

Polak has been published on French military missions to Japan of the late 19th and early 20th centuries (1867–1868, 1872–1880, 1884–1889, and 1918–1919). He was sought for comment due to his work on the life of French adventurer Jules Brunet, an inspiration for the movie The Last Samurai.

He has also written on the involvement of various French engineers and traders in the Europeanization of Japan during the Meiji period, such as Emile Bertin and Léonce Verny. His collaboration with Soichiro Honda on Honda's autobiography was noted for its coverage of Honda's battles with Japan's Ministry of International Trade and Industry over the introduction of the kei car into the Japanese automobile industry.

Polak has written on artists who played a role in Franco-Japanese relations, such as in his book on painter Paul Jacoulet. Tai Kawabata, a Japan Times staff writer, calls him a Jacoulet expert.

According to the Monthly Letter of the French Chamber of Commerce in Japan:

Publications

See also
 France–Japan relations (19th century)

References

External links
 Christian Polak on Japan-US.org
 French Chamber of Commerce and Industry in Japan

Living people
1950 births
French male writers